Djadja may refer to:

Djadja, French rapper part of the French hip hop duo Djadja & Dinaz
"Djadja" (song), 2018 song by Malian singer Aya Nakamura

See also
Djadjawurrung or Dja Dja Wurrung, also known as the Jaara or Jajowrong people and Loddon River tribe, a native Aboriginal tribe which occupied the watersheds of the Loddon and Avoca rivers in the Bendigo region of central Victoria, Australia